Svenska Serien 1913–14, part of the 1913–14 Swedish football season, was the fourth Svenska Serien season played. IFK Göteborg won the league ahead of runners-up Örgryte IS.

League table

References 

Print

Online

1913-14
Sweden
1